Krapanj is an island in the Adriatic Sea, located south of Šibenik, Croatia.

Krapanj is one of the smallest inhabited islands of the Adriatic Sea covering 0.36 km2. It is also the most densely inhabited island and has the lowest elevation (1.5 m above sea level). Krapanj is 300 m offshore at its closest point from the mainland village of Brodarica.

Geography 
It lies in the Dinaric direction, from north-west to south-east.

Geology
Krapanj is composed of Mesozoic limestone and dolomite.

Climate
The island of Krapanj is situated in the central part of the Croatian littoral and is characterised by a warm, dry Mediterranean climate.

History 

Many of the Adriatic Islands were populated in pre-history by the Illyrians. Krapanj however was  first populated by Croatian Toma Jurić, a nobleman from Šibenik and a descendant of the Šubić family from Bribir. Jurić purchased the island in 1436 from the Šibenik County with the intention of building a Franciscan church on the uninhabited island. Realising their father's dream after his death, Jurić's 4 sons completed The Holy Cross Church and monastery in 1523 with blessings from Pope Eugene IV on one condition: only the Friars were to live and inhabit Krapanj.

Krapanj came under the possession of the Franciscan Province of St. Jerome of Dalmatia in the 16th century as the Ottoman Empire invaded neighbouring lands. The Franciscans allowed people living on the neighbouring mainland to build their own settlement, southeast of the monastery who then united to defend themselves against the Ottomans.

Since the work of the Franciscan friars was closely connected to the inhabitants of the island, in 1652, the monastery was given a parish and the friars began offering spiritual and other assistance to parishes on the mainland. The remains of the old church walls, in part, can be seen by the front door of the cloister. The church was expanded in 1937, and the wall bearing the consecration date (May 15, 1523) joins the new church building with the cloister.

Krapanj was the most densely populated of all Croatian Islands given a lucrative economy. But from the middle to late 20th century,  many inhabitants fled communism and poverty by emigrating to Australia, Canada and the United States. Adding to the trend of depopulation, the population decreased from 1,767 in 1981 to only 170 in 2011.

Art and culture 
The island of Krapanj's culture and traditions reflect the Dalmatian way of life. Hard work, good food and a healthy lifestyle embodies the seaside rock houses and tiny side-streets. Krapanj takes pride in its origins of deep sea diving and generally personifies a seafaring culture.

Krapanj's tourist industry is vastly underdeveloped, with the main factor being the prohibition of vehicles on the island. As a result, the island has kept many of the old-world traditions that add a unique charm.

The art of producing wine (vino), olive oil (maslinovo ulje), rakija and sea sponge (spužve) are traditions that date back to pre-history but are still extremely evident in modern-day Krapanj. Food is generally seafood, caught by local fisherman and distributed locally.

Krapanj holds a host of cultural antiquities in the monastery including "The Last Supper" by the 16th-century Italian artist Francesco da Santa Croce and a Renaissance painting titled "The Black Madonna On The Throne".

The biggest event on the island's calendar is the annual Krapljanska Fešta. The day-long festival is held on 2 August and celebrates Gospe od Anđela ("Our Lady of the Angels"). Thousands of people gather on the island for the cultural feast of good food, good wine and centuries of culture. The locals annually proclaim "a night the island almost sank".

Cuisine
Krapanj's island culture has spread throughout the region as many inhabitants now live in mainland Brodarica. Traditionally fish, clams and octopus are either grilled over dried vine leaves or cooked in a wood-fired oven. The signature dishes of the region are Squid Ink Risotto, Octopus Potato Salad and Grilled Fish.

Economy

Deep sea diving

Krapanj has a rich history in underwater diving , primarily in the harvesting and selling of sea sponges. Antun from Crete introduced Krapanj's inhabitants to diving and sea sponge gathering/processing over 300 years ago. For many years, diving for sponges had been the major income for Krapanj families, earning them the title of "Spužvari" (sponge vendors).

By the middle of the 20th century the industry peaked with the inception of breathing apparatus and motorised boats.

The small industry still persists, with sponges from Krapanj sold throughout Europe with a primary market in Greece and Italy. The cosmetic market has in recent years opened the market for Krapanj sponges on an international scale.

The tradition of diving has in latter days given rise to scuba diving, free diving and spearfishing professionals from Krapanj.

The Krapanj monastery museum permanently exhibits a show on sea sponge diving.

Tanfara family private museum Spuga2 is place where you can see and get information about sponge diving from first hand today on Krapanj. They are inside industry for more than 120 years.

Tourism
Krapanj is not on the tourist map. Since the end of the Croatian War of Independence, the island has begun a slow rebuild. Many of its old terraces have either been restored or are in the process of rebuild under strict heritage by-laws. This has started a steady stream of tourists to the island which now supports a certain level of tourism infrastructure.

Many other Adriatic Islands have constructed bridges to allow tourist access by car. Krapanj has made the decision not to connect to the mainland as this would destroy the island's heritage.

Demographics
The island has only one settlement; Krapanj, which, apart from the island itself, consists of islets of Mumonja, Oblik, Krbela mala, Krbela vela and the Oštrica peninsula, located to the south. Krapanj is administratively located in the City of Šibenik and is one of its local committees.

According to the 2011 census, Krapanj had a population of 170.

Gallery

See also
 Šibenik
 Zlarin
 Dalmatia
 Adriatic Sea
 Croatia

References

External links

 Official Tourism Bureau of Krapanj
 Krapanj.com Info on Krapanj
 Krapanj Gallery A Krapanj photo gallery

Islets of Croatia
Islands of the Adriatic Sea
Landforms of Šibenik-Knin County
Sponge diving